Locate Varesino is a comune (municipality) in the Province of Como in the Italian region Lombardy, located about  northwest of Milan and about  southwest of Como. As of 31 December 2015, it had a population of 4,349 and an area of 5.8 km².

Locate Varesino borders the following municipalities: Cairate, Carbonate, Fagnano Olona, Gorla Maggiore, Tradate.

Demographic evolution

References

External links
 www.comune.locatevaresino.co.it/

Cities and towns in Lombardy